Vincent Perez (born 10 June 1964) is a Swiss actor, director and photographer. He played the title character, Ashe Corven, in The Crow: City of Angels, and starred in Queen of the Damned, playing Marius de Romanus. Some of his films in French cinema include Cyrano de Bergerac, Le Bossu, La Reine Margot and Indochine.

Early life 
Perez was born on 10 June 1964 in Lausanne, Switzerland, to a Spanish father and a German mother. His mother was a housewife and his father worked in the import-export business. He commenced acting studies in Geneva, followed by the CNSAD and completed his training at the school of the Théâtre Nanterre-Amandiers. He started acting in theatre before starring in films.

Career

Cinema
His breakthrough role was starring as Christian opposite Gérard Depardieu in Cyrano de Bergerac. He was nominated for a César Award. He has since appeared in various films and his onscreen leading ladies have included Catherine Deneuve, Kim Basinger, Isabelle Adjani and Aaliyah.

On television, he starred in Paris enquêtes criminelles, the French remake of Law & Order: Criminal Intent. Perez starred as Lieutenant Vincent Revel. He also portrayed Frankenstein's monster in a 2004 television movie titled Frankenstein starring Parker Posey in an update of Mary Shelley's 1818 novel Frankenstein.

He has also gone into directing. Two of his shorts, L'échange and Rien à dire, have been nominated for the Palme d'Or at the Cannes Film Festival.

Photography
He has exhibited his photographic work during festivals and in art galleries. For example, his exhibition entitled Face to Face, which featured photographs of Carla Bruni, Johnny Hallyday and Gérard Depardieu, was unveiled at Rencontres d'Arles, an annual photography festival in Arles, France. In December 2012, he exhibited his photographs of dancers of the Bolshoi Ballet at the RuArts in Moscow, Russia. Two years later, in December 2014, he exhibited them again at the Accademia Fine Art Gallery in Monte Carlo, Monaco.

Personal life 
He is married to French actress Karine Silla, ex-partner of Gérard Depardieu and sister of French producer Virginie Besson-Silla. Perez and Silla have three children together, including model Iman Perez.

Work

Filmography

Television

Awards and nominations

César Awards

Palme d'Or

Montréal World Film Festival

MTV Movie Awards Russia

Cabourg Film Festival

References

External links

The Vincent Perez Archives
An Interview with Vincent Perez about Paris enquêtes criminelles (French)

1964 births
Living people
French male film actors
French male television actors
French film directors
People from Lausanne
Swiss male film actors
Swiss male stage actors
Swiss male television actors
Swiss-German people
Swiss film directors
Swiss photographers
Swiss people of Spanish descent
Conservatoire de Paris alumni